Oh, Doctor is a 1937 American comedy film directed by Ray McCarey and written by Harry Clork and Brown Holmes. It is based on the 1923 novel Oh, Doctor! by Harry Leon Wilson. The film stars Edward Everett Horton, Donrue Leighton, William Hall, Eve Arden, Thurston Hall, Catherine Doucet, William Demarest and Edward Brophy. The film was released on April 1, 1937, by Universal Pictures.

Plot
Edward J. Billop is waiting to receive an inheritance, however he is a hypochondriac and believes he is going to die before receiving his inheritance.

Cast       
Edward Everett Horton as Edward J. Billop
Donrue Leighton as Helen Frohman
William Hall as Rodney Cummings
Eve Arden as Shirley Truman
Thurston Hall as 'Doc' Erasmus Thurston
Catherine Doucet as Martha Striker
William Demarest as Marty Short
Edward Brophy as Meg Smith
Minerva Urecal as Death Watch Mary Mackleforth

References

External links
 

1937 films
American comedy films
1937 comedy films
Universal Pictures films
Films directed by Ray McCarey
American black-and-white films
1930s English-language films
1930s American films